Edmond Burke Roche, 1st Baron Fermoy (9 August 1815 – 17 September 1874) was an Irish politician in the British parliament who was granted a title in the Peerage of Ireland. His direct ancestor was Maurice FitzEdmund Roche, Mayor of Cork, who died in 1593.

Early life and career 
Edmond Roche was born on 9 August 1815 in County Cork, Ireland, the son of Edward Roche (1771–1855) and his wife, Margaret Honoria Curtain (1786–1862). He was named in honour of his distant relative, Edmund Burke (1729–1797).

He was elected to the British House of Commons for County Cork in 1837, a seat he held until 1855 (Repeal, later Whig), and then represented Marylebone between 1859 and 1865 (Liberal). In 1855, he became Steward of the Chiltern Hundreds for the Liberal Party. From 1856 to 1874, he also served as Lord Lieutenant of County Cork.

Peerage 
In 1855, he was raised to the Peerage of Ireland as Baron Fermoy by Queen Victoria. After the letters patent were ruled invalid in 1856, the title was granted to him again by new letters patent. After his death in 1874, he was succeeded in the barony by his elder son, Edward Roche, 2nd Baron Fermoy (1850–1920). James Roche, 3rd Baron Fermoy (1852–1920), who briefly succeeded his sonless brother in September 1920, was his younger son.

Personal life 
On 22 August 1848, Edmond Roche married Elizabeth Caroline Boothby (1821–1897), daughter of James Brownell Boothby (1791–1850), of Twyford Abbey, and his wife Charlotte Cunningham (1799–1893). They had seven children:

 Edward Roche, 2nd Baron Fermoy (1850–1920), who married The Hon. Cecilia O'Grady, daughter of Standish O'Grady, 3rd Viscount Guillamore.
 James Roche, 3rd Baron Fermoy (1852–1920), who married Frances Ellen Work (1857–1947) in 1880. They divorced in 1891.
 The Hon. Alexis Charles Burke Roche (1853–1914), who married The Hon. Lucy Maud Goschen, daughter of George Goschen, 1st Viscount Goschen
 The Hon. Eleanor Charlotte Burke Roche (1854–1938), who married William Nicholas Leader
 The Hon. Ulick de Rupe Burke Roche (1856–1919)
 The Hon. Elizabeth Caroline Burke Roche (1857–1940), who married German aristocrat Count Friedrich Maximilian von Hochberg (1868–1921), brother of Count Hans Heinrich XV of Hochberg, Prince of Pless (1861–1938), in 1905.
 The Hon. Edmund Burke Roche (1859–1948)

He died on 17 September 1874 at his residence Trabolgan House, County Cork, aged 59, and was buried in a mausoleum in Corkbeg graveyard, Whitegate, County Cork. His grandson Edmund Roche, 4th Baron Fermoy (1885–1955), was the maternal grandfather of Diana, Princess of Wales.

Ancestry

References

1815 births
1874 deaths
19th-century Irish politicians
Barons Fermoy
Peers of Ireland created by Queen Victoria
Lord-Lieutenants of Cork
Roche, Edmond Burke
Roche, Edmond Burke
Roche, Edmond Burke
Roche, Edmond Burke
Roche, Edmond Burke
Roche, Edmond Burke
Roche, Edmond Burke
UK MPs who were granted peerages
Irish Repeal Association MPs
Edmond